The 1990 UCLA Bruins football team represented University of California, Los Angeles (UCLA) in the 1990 college football season. The team was coached by Terry Donahue and finished the season with a 5–6–0 record in 6th place in the conference. UCLA finished below .500 in consecutive season for the first time since 1963–64.

Schedule

Roster

Season summary

Oklahoma

Stanford

at Michigan

at Washington State

Arizona

San Diego State

at California

Oregon State

at Oregon

at Washington

USC
{{Americanfootballbox
|bg=
|bg2=
|titlestyle=; text-align:center
|state=collapsed
|title=#19 USC Trojans (7–2–1) at UCLA Bruins (5–5)
|date=November 17
|time=
|road=USC
|R1=14 |R2=7 |R3=3 |R4=21
|home=UCLA
|H1=7 |H2=7 |H3=7 |H4=21
|stadium=Rose Bowl, Pasadena, California
|attendance=98,088
|weather=Sunny
|referee=
|TV=ABC
|TVAnnouncers=
|reference=
|scoring=
First quarter
USC – Stephon Pace 27-yard interception return (pass failed). USC 6–0.
UCLA – Tommy Maddox 9-yard run (Brad Daluiso kick). UCLA 7–6.
USC – Mazio Royster 7-yard run (pass good). USC 14–7.
Second quarter
UCLA – Sean LaChapelle 47-yard pass from Tommy Maddox (Brad Daluiso kick). Tie 14–14.
USC – Todd Marinovich 1-yard run (Quin Rodriguez kick). USC 21–14.
Third quarter
USC – Quin Rodriguez 20-yard field goal, 4:19. USC 24–14. Drive: 19 plays, 68 yards.UCLA – Brian Brown 5-yard run (Brad Daluiso kick). USC 24–21.Fourth quarter
USC – Jason Oliver 34-yard interception return (Quin Rodriguez kick), 12:02. USC 31–21.UCLA – Scott Miller 29-yard pass from Tommy Maddox (Brad Daluiso kick), 10:46. USC 31–28.UCLA – Scott Miller 38-yard pass from Tommy Maddox (Brad Daluiso kick), 9:17. UCLA 35–31.USC – Johnnie Morton 21-yard pass from Todd Marinovich (Quin Rodriguez kick), 3:09. USC 38–35. Drive: 8 plays, 47 yards.
UCLA – Kevin Smith 1-yard run (Brad Daluiso kick), 1:19. UCLA 42–38. Drive: 7 plays, 75 yards.
USC – Johnnie Morton 23-yard pass from Todd Marinovich (Quin Rodriguez kick), 0:16. ''USC 45–42. Drive: 5 plays, 75 yards.'' 
|stats=
Top passers
USC – Todd Marinovich – 16/25, 215 yards, 2 TD, INT
UCLA – Tommy Maddox – 26/40, 409 yards, 3 TD, 3 INT
Top rushers
USC – Mazio Royster – 31 rushes, 157 yards, TD
UCLA – Tommy Maddox – 9 rushes, 36 yards, TD
Top receivers
USC – Gary Wellman – 7 receptions, 99 yards
UCLA – Scott Miller – 8 receptions, 175 yards, 2 TD
}}

60th meeting
Maddox 409 yards passing, Miller 175 yards receiving (single game school records)

Awards and honors
 All-Americans: Roman Phifer (OLB), Eric Turner (S), Scott Miller (WR, third team)
 All-Conference First Team:''' Eric Turner (S), Roman Phifer (OLB)

References

UCLA
UCLA Bruins football seasons
UCLA Bruins football